Saiju Kurup (born 12 March 1979) is an Indian actor who works predominantly in Malayalam cinema and occasionally in Tamil cinema. He is credited as Anirudh in Tamil movies. He debuted in Mayookham (2005) by Hariharan. As of June 2021, he has starred in over 100 films as the main lead, villain and supporting role.

Personal life

Kurup married Anupama on 12 February 2005. The couple have a daughter and a son.

Filmography

Malayalam

Tamil

As dubbing artist

Short films

Television

References

External links

 
 

Male actors from Alappuzha
Living people
Male actors in Malayalam cinema
Indian male film actors
21st-century Indian male actors
Male actors in Tamil cinema
People from Alappuzha district
1979 births